Ringwood School (opened in 1959) is a coeducational secondary school and sixth form situated in Ringwood, Hampshire, England.

It was a specialist Language College and became an academy in April 2011, and gained National Teaching School status in July 2011. The school was one of the first 100 designated a Teaching School in the United Kingdom in July 2011.

Sustainability
The school gained the ‘Eco-Schools Green Flag Award’ in 2006, 2008 and 2010. This led to it being designated as one of only 36 schools across the country to ‘lead sustainable development’ by the National College for School Leadership (NCSL) in 2008. The school has recently applied for Ambassador Status for Sustainability.

Ofsted
The school was recognised by Ofsted as ‘outstanding overall’ and ‘outstanding in its Sixth Form provision’ in November 2008, and also Sixth Form Outstanding - 2013.

Academics
In 2012 76% of students achieved 5 A*-C GCSE grades (or equivalent) and 97% of students achieved 3 or more A levels at A*-E (including equivalences).

Sixth Form
Ringwood School has a Sixth Form on campus. The school has a student leadership team, coordinated by various committees, such as the Political Committee which ran monthly question-time style events debating current and topical issues for students.

References

External links
 Ringwood School

Secondary schools in Hampshire
Academies in Hampshire
Educational institutions established in 1959
Ringwood, Hampshire
1959 establishments in England